Stefan Loibl (born 24 June 1996) is a German professional ice hockey player currently playing for Adler Mannheim in the Deutsche Eishockey Liga (DEL) and the German national team.

Playing career
Loibl played six seasons in the DEL with the Straubing Tigers, before leaving out of contract to sign a three-year deal with Adler Mannheim on 7 August 2020.

International play
He represented Germany at the 2019 IIHF World Championship.

On 25 January 2022, Loibl was selected to play for Team Germany at the 2022 Winter Olympics.

Career statistics

International

References

External links

1996 births
Living people
Adler Mannheim players
ESV Kaufbeuren players
EV Landshut players
German ice hockey forwards
Löwen Frankfurt players
People from Straubing
Sportspeople from Lower Bavaria
Skellefteå AIK players
Starbulls Rosenheim players
Straubing Tigers players
Ice hockey players at the 2022 Winter Olympics
Olympic ice hockey players of Germany
German expatriate sportspeople in Sweden
Expatriate ice hockey players in Sweden
German expatriate ice hockey people